James Thomas Betterson (born August 20, 1954) is a former American football running back in the National Football League (NFL) who played for the Philadelphia Eagles. He played college football for the North Carolina Tar Heels.

References

1954 births
Living people
American football running backs
Philadelphia Eagles players
North Carolina Tar Heels football players